Bruck an der Mur is a city of some 13,500 people located in the district Bruck-Mürzzuschlag, in the Austrian state of Styria. It is located at the confluence of the Mur and Mürz Rivers. Its manufacturing includes metal products and paper. Bruck is located on the Graz to Vienna main line, and is an important regional rail junction.

History

The earliest surviving record of Bruck dates from the time of King Ludovicus II "Germanicus", when it was identified, in a record dated 20 November 860, as "ad pruccam", a manor of the archbishopric of Salzburg. The settlement then identified with this name was in the location currently occupied by the suburb now called "St. Ruprecht". The settlement then located at what is now the centre of Bruck is identified in the ninth century record as "muorica kimundi" (i.e. the mouth of the Mürz River).

The town was refounded in 1263 by King Otakar II of Bohemia, who was responsible for surrounding Bruck with its city walls. Bruck received its town privileges in 1277 from King Rudolph von Habsburg who in 1273 succeeded Otakar. Bruck an der Mur was an important medieval trade center specializing in iron work.

Climate

Main sights

The Heiligen-Geist-Kapelle is a 15th-century Gothic chapel, which is of a unique design. The floor plan is an equilateral triangle in honor of the Trinity. This church was completely restored as much as possible to its original appearance, reopening in 2020.

In the centre, there is also the famous Kornmesser house, built in the Venetian style by Pankraz Kornmess in the 15th century.  

The castle of Landskron burned down in the great fire of 1792. After that fire, just two of 166 houses were left standing.

The Grüner See (Green Lake) located in the neighboring municipality of Tragöß-Sankt Katharein is one of the main tourist attractions of the region.

Sister cities
Bruck an der Mur is twinned with:

  Hagen-Hohenlimburg, Germany
  Liévin, France
  Veroli, Italy

Notable people 

 Ernest, Duke of Austria (1377–1424) member of the House of Habsburg, ruled over the Inner Austrian duchies of Styria, Carinthia and Carniola from 1406 until his death
 Rudolf Stöger-Steiner von Steinstätten (1861 in Pernegg an der Mur – 1921) Colonel-General in the Austro-Hungarian army
 Richard Kretz (1865–1920) pathologist, particularly liver cirrhosis
 Menci Clement Crnčić (1865–1930) Croatian painter, printmaker, teacher and museum director
 Edmund Hlawka  (1916–2009) mathematician and number theorist
 Hanns Malissa (1920–2010) analytical chemist and environmental chemist 
 Christian Anders (born 1945) singer, musician, composer and author.
 Eva Rueber-Staier (born 1951) actress, TV Host, model, beauty queen, won Miss World 1969
 Erwin Wurm (born 1954) artist, currently lives and works in Vienna and Limberg
 Werner S. Weiglhofer (1962–2003), theoretical electromagnetcist and Professor of Mathematics at the University of Glasgow
 Ille Gebeshuber (born 1969) physicist, specializes in nanophysics and biomimetics
 Elisabeth Görgl (born 1981) retired World Cup alpine ski racer
 Florian Neukart (born 1982) computer scientist and mathematician, specializes in quantum computing and artificial intelligence

References

 
Cities and towns in Bruck-Mürzzuschlag District
Populated places established in the 13th century
Fischbach Alps